Pristimantis zeuctotylus is a species of frog in the family Strabomantidae.
It is found in Brazil, Colombia, French Guiana, Guyana, Suriname, and Venezuela.
Its natural habitat is tropical moist lowland forests.

References

zeuctotylus
Frogs of South America
Amphibians of Brazil
Amphibians of Colombia
Amphibians of French Guiana
Amphibians of Guyana
Amphibians of Suriname
Amphibians of Venezuela
Amphibians described in 1977
Taxonomy articles created by Polbot